Dylan Evans (born August 18, 1966) is a British former academic and author who has written books on emotion and the placebo effect as well as the theories of Jacques Lacan.

Life and career

Early life and education
Evans was born in Bristol on 29 September 1966 and went to school at Sevenoaks School and West Kent College of Further Education. His father is an aircraft engineer, his mother is a teacher.

At Southampton University he studied Spanish and Linguistics and later he received his doctorate in philosophy from the London School of Economics. His thesis, dated 2000, was titled Rethinking emotion: New research in emotion and recent debates in cognitive science.

Evans is an atheist and also writes and gives lectures on atheism and related topics. He contributed an article to The Blackwell Companion to Science and Christianity arguing that psychology has shown atheism to be a better explanation of the human mind than theism.

Academic career
Evans was a psychoanalyst in the style of Jacques Lacan, and wrote a standard reference work in the field. After several years, however, Evans eventually came to doubt the logical and scientific validity of Lacanianism, and ultimately abandoned the field because he was worried Lacanianism harmed rather than helped patients. Evans worked at the University of Bath and the University of the West of England in artificial intelligence. Evans resigned from the position of senior lecturer at the University of the West of England to start a project in sustainable living called the Utopia Experiment.

Evans was briefly a lecturer in Behavioural Science in the School of Medicine at University College Cork.  In 2010 the university gave him the "President's Award for Research on Innovative Forms of Teaching" for his Cork Science Cafe project (together with colleague Catherine O'Mahony).<ref>Hannah Fearn, "Surprise twist in 'fruitbatgate' row", Times Higher Education, 18 November 2010</ref>

Risk intelligence is one of his research areas.

On 15 September 2010, Evans, along with 54 other public figures, signed an open letter published in The Guardian, stating their opposition to Pope Benedict XVI's state visit to the UK.

In spring 2010 Evans was accused of sexual harassment of a colleague, Rossana Salerno Kennedy, by showing her a published article about oral sex among fruit bats.  His employer imposed a "two-year period of monitoring and appraisal under the university's duty of respect and 'right to dignity' policy," leading Evans to mount a campaign, attracting more than 3000 petition signatures, defending the principle of freedom of expression. In the course of the campaign, confidential documents were leaked, and UCC launched disciplinary action against Evans for alleged breach of confidentiality. Disciplinary proceedings were halted when Evans applied for judicial review at the Irish High Court. On 1 December 2010 the High Court quashed the sanctions imposed on Evans by the President of UCC, which the judge described as "grossly disproportionate", and awarded costs to Evans. The Court upheld the original finding of harassment, but the judge pointed out that "there can be different forms of sexual harassment, ranging from highly objectionable to mildly objectionable" and that "this was at the very lower end of the scale in this case." UCC responded by issuing a statement stating that they were satisfied with the High Court's decision to uphold the original harassment finding, and they declared their intention to proceed with disciplinary proceedings against Evans for alleged breach of confidence.

The Utopia Experiment

From 2006 he spent a while running the "Utopia Experiment" in the Highlands of Scotland.The Utopia Experiment: A radical crash course in self-sufficient living, James Durston, The Independent, 19 July 2007, retrieved 17 May 2010 Apocalypse now, Ross Anderson, The Times, 26 April 2007, retrieved 18 May 2007 This was to be a self-sufficient group of people growing their own food, with no television and limited use of electricity for eighteen months. After ten months Evans had become disillusioned with the project and concerned about their health. He went to see a doctor who referred him to a psychiatrist. Evans was then detained under the Mental Health Act for his own safety. After four weeks in a psychiatric hospital he returned to the experiment to inform the volunteers that it was over. However, they wished for the community to continue and renamed it the Phoenix Experiment. As of 2015 some of them were still there.

After the "Utopia Experiment"
After leaving the experiment Evans moved to Ireland where he was a resident for 5 years. He then relocated to Guatemala. In a 2015 interview he said he was working on a novel set in the region. Evans also became the CEO of Projection Point, a risk intelligence company.

Selected publications
BooksThe Utopia Experiment (2015)Atheism: All That Matters (2014)Risk Intelligence: How to Live with Uncertainty (2012)Emotion, Evolution and Rationality (2004)Placebo: The Belief Effect (2003)Introducing Evolution (2001)Emotion: The Science of Sentiment (2001)Introducing Evolutionary Psychology (1999) An Introductory Dictionary of Lacanian Psychoanalysis'' (1996)

References

External links
Homepage
Read Dylan Evans's articles in the 5th Estate blog

1966 births
Living people
Academics of King's College London
Academics of University College Cork
British psychologists
British psychoanalysts
Evolutionary psychologists
British humanists
British expatriates in Ireland
British scientists
People educated at Sevenoaks School